Aleksandr Vladimirovich Smirnov may refer to:

Aleksandr Smirnov (footballer, born 1968), Russian football player and coach
Aleksandr Smirnov (footballer, born 1980), Russian football player

See also
 Aleksandr Smirnov (disambiguation)